Parliamentary elections were held in Azerbaijan on 6 November 2005. They pitted candidates of the ruling New Azerbaijan Party (NAP) against opposition led by the Azadlıq (Freedom) bloc of the Azerbaijan Popular Front Party, Musavat and the Azerbaijan Democratic Party.  The NAP won 61 of the 125 seats. The results were contested, with allegations of vote-rigging from the opposition.

Conduct
Human Rights Watch expressed concern about widespread intimidation of opposition supporters, saying that the elections could not be free or fair under such conditions. Several opposition leaders were arrested two days before the elections.

ARTICLE 19 said Azerbaijani authorities were responsible for the violent harassment of journalists covering opposition rallies, frequent attacks and forced closure of independent media outlets, and widespread abuse of state and local resources in favour of pro-government candidates. The Organization for Security and Co-operation in Europe reported that the vote counting process was "bad or very bad in 43 per cent of counts observed." However, observers from the Commonwealth of Independent States claimed the irregularities "were not of mass character and did not have [an] impact on the free expression of voters' will".

The opposition had hoped for another color revolution, but analysts doubted this would happen. Movements like Yox!, Yeni Fikir or Meqam were not yet ready for revolution according to Emin Huseynov, founder of Meqam.

Results
The Central Election Commission reported, with 28% of votes counted, 62% win for the NAP, 3% for the Equality Party, 1% for the APFP, 2% for independent candidates and 2% each to two other small parties. These results were contradicted by a Mitofsky International and Edison Media Research poll which predicted the NAP going from 75 to 56 seats in the 125-member assembly, with the Azadliq bloc winning 12 seats.

References

Parliamentary elections in Azerbaijan
Azerbaijan 
Azerbaijan 
2005 in Azerbaijan
Election and referendum articles with incomplete results